The Deha, sometimes pronounced as Dahiya, Dhaya, Dhea, Daiya and Dheya are a caste found in India, and have other backward caste status in Haryana. They forms the largest jat community in Haryana.

Origin 

According to some traditions, the community are a branch of the Balmiki community. Community myths refer to their descent from two brothers, Chhaju and Raju. Chhaju's daughter took to scavenging, and as such was ostracised. Over time her descendants came to form a distinct community. Other traditions make references to the fact the community emigrated from Sargodha in what is now Pakistan. The Deha speak their own dialect, although most also speak Haryanvi.

Present circumstances 

The Deha were traditionally a nomadic community, that have only recently settled down. Many are now found in encampments at the outskirts of towns and villages. They are strictly endogamous community, and consists of a number of exogamous clans. Their main clans are the Kalyana, Kandara, Sarsar, Jhung, Thual, Chanal, and Ghussar.

A majority of the Deha are now day labourers, with many working in the construction industry. A small number have been given land as part of government schemes to settle the community. But these plots are extremely small, and most supplement their income by working as agricultural labourers. Most live in multi-caste villages, often working for Jat or Brahmin patrons. They are an extremely marginalized community, suffering from severe poverty.

See also 

 Bangali

References 

Dalit communities
Dom in India
Dom people
Social groups of Haryana
Scheduled Castes of Haryana
Romani in India